Conus pergrandis, common name the grand cone, is a species of sea snail, a marine gastropod mollusk in the family Conidae, the cone snails and their allies.

Like all species within the genus Conus, these snails are predatory and venomous. They are capable of "stinging" humans, therefore live ones should be handled carefully or not at all.

Description
The size of the shell varies between 73 mm and 161 mm.

Distribution
This marine species occurs off Taiwan, Indo-China, Indo-Malaysia, New Caledonia, Papua New Guinea, Philippines, the Western Pacific and Queensland, Australia.

References

 Iredale, T. 1937. Embrikena, a new Genus of the Family Conidae (Phylum Mollusca). Festschrift für Prof. Dr. Embrik Strand, Riga 3: 406–408, pl. 18
 Cernohorsky, W.O. 1978. Tropical Pacific Marine Shells. Sydney : Pacific Publications 352 pp., 68 pls. 
 Kosuge, S. 1980. Description of a new species of the genus Conus. Bulletin of the Institute of Malacology, Tokyo 1(5): 81–82 
 Petuch, E.J. & Mendenhall, W. 1972. A new species of Conus from Taiwan. The Veliger 15(2): 96
 Wilson, B. 1994. Australian Marine Shells. Prosobranch Gastropods. Kallaroo, WA : Odyssey Publishing Vol. 2 370 pp. 
 Röckel, D., Korn, W. & Kohn, A.J. 1995. Manual of the Living Conidae. Volume 1: Indo-Pacific Region. Wiesbaden : Hemmen 517 pp.
 Tucker J.K. & Tenorio M.J. (2009) Systematic classification of Recent and fossil conoidean gastropods. Hackenheim: Conchbooks. 296 pp.
 Puillandre N., Duda T.F., Meyer C., Olivera B.M. & Bouchet P. (2015). One, four or 100 genera? A new classification of the cone snails. Journal of Molluscan Studies. 81: 1–23

External links
 The Conus Biodiversity website
 Cone Shells – Knights of the Sea
 

pergrandis
Gastropods described in 1937